The Visayas, or the Visayan Islands (Visayan: Kabisay-an,), are one of the three principal geographical divisions of the Philippines, along with Luzon and Mindanao. Located in the central part of the archipelago, it consists of several islands, primarily surrounding the Visayan Sea, although the Visayas are also considered the northeast extremity of the entire Sulu Sea. Its inhabitants are predominantly the Visayan peoples.

The major islands of the Visayas are Panay, Negros, Cebu, Bohol, Leyte and Samar. The region may also include the provinces of Palawan, Romblon, and Masbate  whose populations identify as Visayan and whose languages are more closely related to other Visayan languages than to the major languages of Luzon.

There are three administrative regions in the Visayas: Western Visayas (pop. 7.9 million), Central Visayas (8 million) and Eastern Visayas (4.5 million). The Negros Island Region existed from 2015 to 2017, separating Negros Occidental and its capital Bacolod from Western Visayas and Negros Oriental from Central Visayas. The region has been dissolved since.

Etymology
The exact meaning of the name of the Visayas is unknown however the word itself derives from Sanskrit. The name was first documented by Song-era Chinese maritime official Zhao Rugua as the Pi-she-ye, who raided the coasts of Fujian and Penghu during the late 12th century using iron javelins attached to ropes as their weapons. The word "Bisaya" was first documented in Spanish sources in reference only to the non-Ati inhabitants of the island of Panay and possibly parts of Negros. The peoples they first encountered in Western Visayas were described by the Spanish as being "white people" and were not characterized as being tattooed, although inhabitants of Panay living in the mountainous regions did practice tattooing. In contrast, the Spaniards called the inhabitants of the other Visayan islands of Cebu, Bohol, and Leyte as the Pintados ("the painted ones") in reference to their practice of tattooing their entire bodies.

Speculations
From the 1950s to 1960s there were spurious claims by various authors that "Bisaya" is derived from "Sri Vijaya", arguing that the Visayans were either settlers from Sri Vijaya or were subjects of it. This claim is largely based only on the resemblance of the word Bisaya to Vijaya. But as the linguist Eugene Verstraelen pointed out, Vijaya would evolve into Bidaya or Biraya, not Bisaya, based on how other Sanskrit-derived loanwords become integrated into Philippine languages.

The name has also been hypothesized to be related to the Bisaya ethnic group of Borneo, the latter incidentally recounted in the Maragtas epic as the alleged origins of the ancestral settlers in Panay. However historical, archeological, and linguistic evidence for this are still paltry. The languages of the Bisaya of Borneo and of the Bisaya of the Philippines do not show any special correlation, apart from the fact that they all belong to the same Austronesian family. Similarly there are claims that it was the name of a folk hero (allegedly "Sri Visaya") or that it originated from the exclamation "Bisai-yah!" ("How beautiful!") by the Sultan of Brunei who was visiting Visayas for the first time. All these claims have been challenged and remain as mere speculations and folk etymologies.

Geography

It is consist of several islands, including Samar, Negros, Panay, Leyte, Cebu, Bohol, Guimaras, Biliran, Siquijor, Panaon and Bantayan.

List of islands by population (2015 census)

List of Islands 

 Panay – 4,477,247
 Negros – 4,414,131
 Cebu – 4,164,535
 Leyte – 2,388,518
 Samar –  1,751,267
 Bohol – 1,211,000
 Mactan –  467,824
 Guimaras –  174,613
 Biliran – 171,612
 Bantayan – 136,960
 Siquijor – 95,984
 Panglao – 79,216
 Panaon – 57,703
 Pacijan –  55,180
 Daram – 39,032
 Poro – 36,508
 Boracay – 32,267
 Ponson – 11,308
 Maripipi – 7,159
 Limasawa – 6,061
 Homonhon – 4,211 
 Parasan – 3,847
 Batbatan – 2,851
 Mararison – 750
 Maniguin – 719

History

After the defeat of the Magellan expedition at the Battle of Mactan by Lapu-Lapu, King Philip II of Spain sent Miguel López de Legazpi in 1543 and 1565 to colonize the islands for Spain. Subsequently, the Visayas region and many kingdoms began converting to Christianity and adopting western culture. By the 18th and 19th centuries, the effects of colonization on various ethnic groups turned sour and revolutions such as those of Francisco Dagohoy began to emerge.

Various personalities who fought against the Spanish colonial government arose within the archipelago. Among the notable ones are Graciano Lopez Jaena and Martin Delgado from Iloilo, Aniceto Lacson, León Kilat and Diego de la Viña from Negros, Venancio Jakosalem Fernandez from Cebu, and two personalities from Bohol by the name of Tamblot, who led the Tamblot Uprising in 1621 to 1622 and Francisco Dagohoy, the leader of the Bohol Rebellion that lasted from 1744 to 1829. Negros briefly stood as an independent nation in the Visayas in the form of the Cantonal Republic of Negros, before it was absorbed back to the Philippines because of the American takeover of the archipelago.

The short-lived Federal State of the Visayas was established as a revolutionary state during the Philippine Revolution. It designated Iloilo City as the Visayas capital and was composed of three governments: the Provisional Government of the District of Visayas (Panay), the Cantonal Government of Negros, the Cantonal Government of Bohol, and the island of Cebu, which was under revolutionary control.

On May 23, 2005, Palawan (including its highly urbanized capital city of Puerto Princesa) was transferred from Mimaropa (Region IV-B) to Western Visayas (Region VI) under Executive Order No. 429, signed by Gloria Macapagal Arroyo, who was the president at that year. However, Palaweños criticized the move, citing a lack of consultation, with most residents in Puerto Princesa and all Palawan municipalities but one, preferring to stay in Mimaropa (Region IV-B). Consequently, Administrative Order No. 129 was issued on August 19, 2005, that the implementation of E.O. 429 be held in abeyance, pending approval by the president of its Implementation Plan. The Philippine Commission on Elections reported the 2010 Philippine general election results for Palawan as a part of the Region IV-B results. , the abeyance was still in effect, with Palawan and its capital city remaining under Mimaropa (Region IV-B).

On May 29, 2015, the twin provinces of Negros Occidental (including its highly urbanized capital city of Bacolod) and Negros Oriental were joined to form the Negros Island Region under Executive Order No. 183, signed by President Benigno Aquino III. It separated both, the former province and its capital city from Western Visayas and the latter province from Central Visayas.

On August 9, 2017, President Rodrigo Duterte signed Executive Order No. 38, revoking the Executive Order No. 183 signed by (former) President Benigno Aquino III on May 29, 2015, due to the reason of the lack of funds to fully establish the NIR according to Benjamin Diokno, the Secretary of Budget and Management.

Mythical allusions and hypotheses

Historical documents written in 1907 by Visayan historian Pedro Alcántara Monteclaro in his book Maragtas tell the story of the ten leaders (Datus) who escaped from the tyranny of Rajah Makatunaw from Borneo and came to the islands of Panay. The chiefs and followers were said to be the ancestors (from the collapsing empires of Srivijaya and Majapahit) of the Visayan people. The documents were accepted by Filipino historians and found their way into the history of the Philippines. As a result, the arrival of Bornean tribal groups in the Visayas (From Vijayapura a Srivijayan vassal state in Borneo) is celebrated in the festivals of the Dinagyang in Iloilo City, Ati-Atihan in Kalibo, Aklan, and Binirayan in San Jose de Buenavista, Antique. Foreign historians such as William Henry Scott maintains that the book contains a Visayan folk tradition.

A contemporary theory based on a study of genetic markers in present-day populations is that Austronesian peoples from Taiwan populated the larger island of Luzon and headed south to the Visayas and Mindanao, and then to Indonesia and Malaysia, then to Pacific Islands and finally to the island of Madagascar, at the west of the Indian Ocean. The study, though, may not explain inter-island migrations, which are also possible, such as Filipinos migrating to any other Philippine provinces. There has even been backmigration to the island of Taiwan, as the historian Efren B. Isorena, through analysis of historical accounts and wind currents in the Pacific side of East and Southeast Asia, concluded that the Pisheye of Taiwan and the Bisaya of the Visayas islands in the Philippines, were closely related people as Visayans were recorded to have travelled to Taiwan from the Philippines via the northward windcurrents before they raided China and returned south after the southwards monsoon during summer.

Administrative divisions

Administratively, the Visayas is divided into 3 regions, namely Western Visayas, Central Visayas and Eastern Visayas. Each region is headed by a Regional Director who is elected from a pool of governors from the different provinces in each region.

The Visayas is composed of 16 provinces, each headed by a Governor. A governor is elected by popular vote and can serve a maximum of three terms consisting of three years each.

Western Visayas (Region VI)
Western Visayas consists of the islands of Panay and Guimaras and the western half of Negros. The regional center is Iloilo City. Its provinces are:
 Aklan
 Antique
 Capiz
 Guimaras
 Iloilo
 Negros Occidental

Central Visayas (Region VII)
Central Visayas includes the islands of Cebu, Siquijor and Bohol and the eastern half of Negros. The regional center is Cebu City. Its provinces are:
 Bohol
 Cebu
 Negros Oriental
 Siquijor

Eastern Visayas (Region VIII)
Eastern Visayas consists of the islands of Leyte,
Samar and Biliran. The regional center is Tacloban City. Its provinces are:
 Biliran
 Leyte
 Southern Leyte
 Eastern Samar
 Northern Samar
 Samar

Scholars have argued that the region of Mimaropa and the province of Masbate are all part of the Visayas in line with the non-centric view. This is contested by a few politicians in line with the Manila-centric view.

Demographics

Language

Languages spoken at home are primarily Visayan languages despite the usual misconception that these are dialects of a single macrolanguage. Major languages include Hiligaynon or Ilonggo in much of Western Visayas, Cebuano in Central Visayas, and Waray in Eastern Visayas. Other dominant languages are Aklanon, Kinaray-a, and Capiznon. Filipino, the 'national language' based on Tagalog, is widely understood but seldom used. English, another official language, is more widely known and is preferred as the second language most especially among urbanized Visayans. For instance, English rather than Tagalog is frequently used in schools, public signs and mass media.

Cebuano vs. Bisaya

Although the word Bisaya has been adapted into the Cebuano terminology for centuries, it should never be equated with the word Cebuano. Even if its origin still has a lot of issues up to the present time, the word Bisaya is commonly used to refer to the inhabitants who originated (born) in any of the islands within the Visayas region. These inhabitants may be currently living in the Visayas region or migrated to other islands in the Philippines including Luzon and Mindanao. It is therefore not accurate to exclusively identify Bisaya with Cebuano because that precludes all the other inhabitants of the region. All Cebuanos can be called Bisaya, but not all Bisaya can be called Cebuanos. Furthermore, Bisaya should not be referred to as a language and should never be equated with the Cebuano language, although majority of the Visayan inhabitants speak the Cebuano language. The most commonly used Cebuano term to have a reference to the Visayan group of languages is "Binisaya". It is an adjective that is used to describe also anything that pertains to being Visayan. For example: "binisaya'ng awit" which is translated into English as, "Visayan song".

See also
 Visayans
 Regions of the Philippines
 Provinces of the Philippines
 Mindanao
 Luzon

Notes

References

External links
 
 
 

 
Island groups of the Philippines
Archipelagoes of the Philippines
Archipelagoes of the Pacific Ocean
Archipelagoes of Southeast Asia
Maritime Southeast Asia